Gas phase electrophoretic molecular mobility analysis (GEMMA) is a method for chemical analysis in which nanoflow electrospray ionization creates highly charged ions from macromolecules that are charge reduced and separated in a differential mobility analyzer.

See also
Ion-mobility spectrometry–mass spectrometry
Differential mobility detector
Particle mass analyser
Electrical mobility
Electrical aerosol spectrometer

References

Mass spectrometry
Laboratory techniques